The 2018–19 Wofford Terriers men's basketball team represented Wofford College during the 2018–19 NCAA Division I men's basketball season. The Terriers, led by 17th-year head coach Mike Young, played their home games at the newly opened Jerry Richardson Indoor Stadium in Spartanburg, South Carolina as members of the Southern Conference.

On February 25, 2019, the Terriers entered the AP Poll at No. 24. This was Wofford's first AP Poll appearance in program history.

They finished the season 30–5, and 18–0 in SoCon play, to win the regular season championship. They defeated VMI, East Tennessee State, and UNC Greensboro to be champions of the SoCon tournament. They received the SoCon's automatic-bid to the NCAA tournament where they defeated Seton Hall in the first round before losing in the second round to Kentucky.

Previous season
The Terriers finished the 2017–18 season 21–13, 11–7 in SoCon play to finish in a tie for fourth place. They defeated Mercer in the quarterfinals of the SoCon tournament to advance to the semifinals where they lost to UNC Greensboro. They were invited to the CollegeInsider.com Tournament where, after a first round bye, they lost in the second round to Central Michigan.

Roster

Schedule and results

|-
!colspan=9 style=| Regular season

|-
!colspan=9 style=| SoCon tournament

|-
!colspan=9 style=| NCAA tournament

|-

Source:

References 

Wofford Terriers men's basketball seasons
Wofford
Woff
Woff
Wofford